Mandya Institute of Medical Sciences, in short MIMS, is an autonomous government medical college of Government of Karnataka. Located on the National Highway 275 of Benagaluru - Mysuru at a distance of 90 kilometers from Bangalore and 46 kilometers from Mysuru.

Background
The institution started in the year of 2005 and the 1st batch of students was admitted in the year of 2006. The 1st batch of Post Graduate students including Pre and Para Clinical subjects admitted in the year 2010 – 2011.

Campus
The Medical College and its ancillaries are located on a sprawling 25 acre of campus,  located abutting the highway. The college has an attached 550 bedded hospital. The campus also houses the residential quarters for the faculty and staff and separate male and female hostels for undergraduate and post graduate students.

A COVID-19 lab has been established at MIMS on the wake of COVID-19 pandemic. MIMS was in news for delivering 107 healthy babies from corona affected pregnant women.

Administration
The management of the institution vests with the Governing council which is chaired by the Karnataka  Minister for Medical Education. The Head of the Institution is the Director who is assisted by the Principal, Medical Superintendent, Chief Administrative Officer, Financial Advisor and the Heads of Departments.

Admission
MIMS is a 100% merit oriented institution and the students are selected through the common entrance test at the state level (85% of the seats) and the national level entrance test (15% of the seats).

Courses offered 
The offered courses are officially permitted by the Medical Council of India.

Under graduation
M.B.B.S.
The college offers the four and a half year M.B.B.S. course with a one-year internship in affiliated hospitals. Total sanctioned seats for this course is 150, out of this, 85% seats are for Karnataka  students and 15% seats for All India Quota students.

Post graduation
 Post-graduate degree courses (MD/MS)
50% seats for Karnataka state students and 50% for All India quota students.
 Anatomy
 Physiology
 Biochemistry
 Pathology
 Microbiology
 Pharmacology
 Forensic Medicine
 Community Medicine
 Dermatology
 Ophthalmology
 ENT
 General Medicine
 Anaesthesia
 Orthopedics
 Paediatrics
 General Surgery
 OBG

Para Medical Courses
2 Years course for PUC passed students and 3 Years course for SSLC passed students.
 Diploma in Health Inspector (DHI)
 Diploma in Medical Laboratory Technology (DMLT)
 Diploma in Operation Theatre Technology (DOTT)
 Diploma in Medical Record Technology (DMRT)
 Diploma in Ophthalmic Technology (DOT)
 Diploma in X-Ray Technology (DMXT)

Note: Each para medical course carries 20 seats.

See also
Medical Colleges in Karnataka

References

Medical colleges in India
Medical colleges in Karnataka